Siarhei Papok (born January 6, 1988 in Minsk) is a Belarusian road bicycle racer, who currently rides for UCI Continental team .

Major results 
Source:

2005
 1st Stage 3 Trophée Centre Morbihan
 2nd Trofeo Città di Ivrea
 3rd  Time trial, UCI Juniors World Championships
2006
 1st Moldova President's Cup
 1st Stage 2a Giro della Lunigiana
 3rd Overall Cup of Grudziadz Town President
 5th Road race, UCI Juniors World Championships
2007
 1st Moldova President's Cup
 2nd Road race, National Under-23 Road Championships
 2nd Coppa Città di Asti
2008
 National Under-23 Road Championships
1st  Road race
1st  Time trial
 2nd Overall Tour of Sochi
2009
 1st Coppa Ciuffenna
 1st GP Città di Sona
 3rd Riolo Terme
 8th ZLM Tour
2010
 1st Giro del Belvedere
 3rd GP Folignano
 4th Overall Giro delle Regioni
 5th Trofeo Banca Popolare di Vicenza
 5th Trofeo Città di San Vendemiano
 9th Overall Giro della Regione Friuli Venezia Giulia
2011
 1st La Popolarissima
 1st Circuito Silvanese
 1st Stage 4 Giro della Valle d'Aosta
 1st Stage 5 Giro della Cuneesi
 2nd Memorial Glulio Bresci
 5th Trofeo Edil C
2012
 1st GP Città di Empoli
 1st Coppa Ciuffenna
 1st Coppa Colli Briantei Internazionale
 2nd Road race, National Road Championships
 2nd La Bolghera
 3rd Pistoia–Fiorano
2013
 1st Central European Tour Miskolc GP
 Dookoła Mazowsza
1st  Points classification
1st Stages 2 & 3
 2nd Road race, National Road Championships
 3rd Central European Tour Budapest GP
 10th Race Horizon Park 2
2014
 2nd Time trial, National Road Championships
 4th ProRace Berlin
 9th Overall Five Rings of Moscow
2015
 1st Grand Prix of Moscow
 1st Grand Prix Minsk
 Five Rings of Moscow
1st Points classification
1st Stage 1
 2nd Race Horizon Park Maidan
 3rd Moscow Cup
 5th Overall Tour of China I
1st Stage 6
 7th Overall Tour of China II
2016
 1st Grand Prix of Vinnytsia
 1st Grand Prix Minsk
 1st UAE Cup
 Tour of Ukraine
1st Points classification
1st Stages 2b & 3
 Sharjah International Cycling Tour
1st Stages 2 & 4
 4th Minsk Cup
 6th Overall Tour of Estonia
 7th Overall Tour of Mersin
 9th Belgrade Banjaluka II
2017
 1st Stage 2 Tour of Mersin
 3rd Overall Tour of China I
 4th Grand Prix Minsk
 4th Memoriał Henryka Łasaka
 9th Tour de Ribas
2018
 National Road Championships
2nd Road race
4th Time trial
 3rd Overall Tour of Estonia
 4th Overall Tour of Mediterrennean
 4th Grand Prix Minsk
 4th Memoriał Andrzeja Trochanowskiego
 10th Memoriał Romana Siemińskiego
2019
 1st Stage 9 Tour of Qinghai Lake
 2nd Grand Prix Justiniano Hotels
 5th Road race, National Road Championships
 8th Horizon Park Race Maidan
 8th Grand Prix Alanya
 9th Odessa Grand Prix
 9th Tour de Ribas
2020
 7th Grand Prix Gazipaşa

References

External links 

Belarusian male cyclists
1988 births
Living people
Cyclists from Minsk